Dalivandan (also Romanized as Dalīvandān; also known as Delimandan) is a village in Tulem Rural District, Tulem District, Sowme'eh Sara County, Gilan Province, Iran. At the 2006 census, its population was 645, in 205 families.

References 

Populated places in Sowme'eh Sara County